Frank Hutchison (March 20, 1897 – November 9, 1945) was an American early country blues and Piedmont blues musician and songwriter. Okeh Records promotional materials referred to him as “The Pride of West Virginia,” and he is thought to be the first non-African American musician to record in the country blues idiom. Hutchison was best known as a slide guitar player, where he held the guitar in his lap and used a pen knife as a slide.

Biography
Born in Raleigh County, West Virginia, United States, and moving to Logan County when he was young, Hutchison   cut several tracks for Okeh Records. He worked as a coal miner at various coal mines in Logan County, West Virginia, both before and after his career as a recording artist. His exposure to Appalachian music came at an early age because his grandfather played fiddle and banjo in Logan before he died in 1903 in a mining accident. In 1904, the railroad first came into Logan County and exposed Hutchison to African-American blues and pre-blues. Hutchison is said to have walked with a limp, possibly as a result of a mining accident.

Between 1926 and 1929, Hutchison recorded forty-one sides for Okeh, of which nine were unissued. Three of the issued sides and three of the unissued were recorded with Sherman Lawson, a Logan County fiddler; others featured Hutchison's guitar, harmonica and voice. Hutchison also performed in the "Okeh Medicine Show," released by Okeh in 1929.

Some years after his recording career had ended and after he left the Logan County coal mines, Hutchison and his wife operated a store in Lake, West Virginia, where he also served as postmaster. His family lived above the store. The store burned down, Hutchison lost everything and reportedly developed alcohol problems after that. He worked as a riverboat entertainer on the Ohio River and eventually moved to Columbus, Ohio.

He died in 1945 at a Dayton, Ohio hospital, of liver disease, aged 48. He is buried in a hillside family cemetery in Lake, West Virginia.

Hutchison is considered to be one of the finest performers of the "white country blues" genre of early folk music. One of his more famous recordings is "The Train That Carried My Girl From Town." His recording of "Stackalee" was included in Harry Smith's 1952 Anthology of American Folk Music, and influenced a number of musicians during the 1950s and 1960s folk revival. Hutchison’s songs have been covered by or have influenced Doc Watson, John Fahey, Bob Dylan, Mike Seeger, Roscoe Holcomb, Cowboy Copas, Frank Fairfield, Chris Smither, and Charlie Parr.  He was inducted into the West Virginia Music Hall of fame in 2018.

Original discography

References

Bibliography

External links
 

1890s births
1945 deaths
American country guitarists
American male guitarists
Piedmont blues musicians
American blues singers
American blues guitarists
Slide guitarists
American blues harmonica players
Country blues musicians
Singers from West Virginia
Songwriters from West Virginia
People from Logan County, West Virginia
Deaths from liver disease
American country harmonica players
20th-century American singers
20th-century American guitarists
Guitarists from West Virginia
20th-century American male singers
American male songwriters